Luz y sombra (English title: Light and shadow) is a Mexican telenovela  produced by Gonzalo Martínez Ortega for Televisa in 1989.

Thalía and Alberto Mayagoitía starred as protagonists, while Enrique Álvarez Félix starred as main antagonist.

Plot 
Alma and José are two young people who try to succeed and achieve their goals in life, in spite of the odds and difficult circumstances they were born into, surrounded by poverty, economic disparity, homeless street children and substance abusers.

Alma lives with her mother Mercedes, who led her daughter to believe that her father Eusebio died, but the truth is that he left them long ago and now lives with another woman. José, meanwhile, is a boy who dreams of being a great Olympic swimmer, just as Alma dreams of becoming a famous ballerina.

Despite the hostilities they are forced to endure daily, Alma and Joseph don't stop trying to succeed and achieve their dreams, even if they have to go through misfortunes and sufferings.

Cast 

 Thalía as Alma Suárez
  as José Guerra
 Enrique Álvarez Félix as Juan Guerra
  as Lucía
 Eric del Castillo
 Delia Casanova as Mercedes "Meche" de Suárez
 Carlos Bracho as Ricardo Saucedo
 Blanca Sánchez as Aurora Linares de Guerra
 Socorro Bonilla as Leticia
 Quintín Bulnes as Guido
  as Satanás
 Mario León as Simón
 Roberto Sosa as Sergio Luna
 Fabián as El Zorra
  as Marcela
  as Caridad "Cari"
 Uriel Chávez as Tomás
 Jaime Lozano
 Rosita Arenas as Sra. Orozco
  as Eusebio Suárez
  as El Costeño
 Holda Ramírez as Mary Tere
 Antua Terrazas as Toño
 Gustavo Navarro as Gustavo
  as El Viborín
 Eva Prado as Cecilia
 José Luis Llamas as Urbano
 Alejandrina Fuentes as Gela

References

External links 

1989 telenovelas
Mexican telenovelas
Televisa telenovelas
Spanish-language telenovelas
1989 Mexican television series debuts
1989 Mexican television series endings